Ben Seka has been the Anglican Bishop of Central Solomons, one of the nine dioceses that make up the Anglican Church of Melanesia, since 2011.

References

Living people
21st-century Anglican bishops in Oceania
Anglican bishops of Central Solomons
Year of birth missing (living people)